Palaquium ridleyi is a tree in the family Sapotaceae. It is named for the English botanist Henry Nicholas Ridley.

Description
The bark is brownish grey. Inflorescences bear up to 11 flowers. The timber is used for making shingles in Sumatra.

Distribution and habitat
Palaquium ridleyi is found from Vietnam through Malesia to New Guinea. Its habitat is peat swamp and kerangas forests.

References

ridleyi
Trees of Vietnam
Trees of Malesia
Trees of New Guinea
Plants described in 1906